Aristote N'Dongala (born 19 January 1994) is a Congolese professional footballer who plays as a winger and wing-back for Academica Clinceni.

Club career
N'Dongala joined FC Nantes at the age of 17 in 2011. He made his senior debut for the club on 22 January 2013, replacing Adrien Trebel for the final 24 minutes of a Coupe de France match against SAS Épinal at Stade de la Colombière. He made his Ligue 1 debut on 17 May 2014 against SC Bastia in a 0–1 away win, playing the full game.

In January 2017, N'Dongala joined Bulgarian First League club Lokomotiv Gorna Oryahovitsa. He did not report back at the beginning of the 2017–18 season so the club undertook legal proceedings at FIFA. However, he was announced as new addition to the squad on 15 September.

In January 2018 N'Dongala signed a contract with Cherno More.  On 17 February, he made his debut in a 1–4 home defeat by Beroe, coming on as substitute for Hugo Konongo at the start of the second half. In January 2020, N'Dongala became part of the Academica Clinceni team in neighbouring Romania.

International career

In 2013 Sébastien Migné, coach of the DRC national U-20 team, called N'Dongala up to be a member of the Democratic Republic of the Congo national under-20 football team for the 2013 African Youth Championship in Algeria.

He made his debut for the senior national team in 2015.

Career statistics

References

External links
 

1994 births
Living people
Democratic Republic of the Congo footballers
Democratic Republic of the Congo under-20 international footballers
Democratic Republic of the Congo international footballers
Ligue 1 players
First Professional Football League (Bulgaria) players
Second Professional Football League (Bulgaria) players
Liga I players
US Créteil-Lusitanos players
FC Nantes players
FC Lokomotiv Gorna Oryahovitsa players
PFC Cherno More Varna players
LPS HD Clinceni players
Democratic Republic of the Congo expatriate footballers
Democratic Republic of the Congo expatriate sportspeople in France
Democratic Republic of the Congo expatriate sportspeople in Belgium
Democratic Republic of the Congo expatriate sportspeople in Romania
Expatriate footballers in France
Expatriate footballers in Belgium
Expatriate footballers in Bulgaria
Expatriate footballers in Romania
2013 African U-20 Championship players
Association football fullbacks
Association football wingers
Footballers from Kinshasa
21st-century Democratic Republic of the Congo people